The Djurdjura or Jurjura Range (Jabal Jurjura; Berber Adrar n Jerjer) is a mountain range of the Tell Atlas, part of the Atlas Mountain System. It is located in Kabylie, Algeria.

Geography
The Djurdjura is a massif made up of two differentiated ranges, one in the north with the Haïzer and Akouker subranges and the other in the south.
Other notable summits are the 2,305 m high Ich n'Timedouine (أكارو تيمدواي), a peak located in the central area of the massif, highest point of the Akouker subrange.
 
Adrar n'Hayzer (أدرار نن هيدزر), the highest point of the Haïzer subrange, is a 2,164 m tall summit rising above Bouira and the high valley of Oued Dhous. 
The Thaletat is a 1,638 m high rocky mountain with a very original shape located in Tizi Ouzou Province.

Other notable features of the Djurdjura range are the 1,750 m high Tizi n'Tirourda (تيروردا) mountain pass at the eastern end and the Kweryet (كويرت), a 1500 m high mountain that rises to the north of the massif. This mountain gave its name to an ancient commune, Douar N'Kweryet, a commune that gathered certain villages of the Ouacifs (At Wasif) and the Ouadhia (Iwadhiyen).

History
The range had been known to the ancient Romans as Mons Ferratus, the Iron Mountains.
Famous mediaeval explorer Ibn Batuta went to Béjaïa through this mountain range. He was heading towards Tunis with a caravan on his Hajj journey and he traveled to Béjaïa from Mitidja, a plain near Algiers.

Resorts and protected areas
The Djurdjura National Park is a protected area within the range.

This mountain range also has a ski resort (أكابور مركز تيكجدة) at Tikjda with places such as the Point De Vue Du Djurdjura, as well as the Gouffre de l’Akouker. The resort is located at a height of 1,478 m.

Features

See also
Kabyles
 List of mountains in Algeria
Tell Atlas

References

External links

Les montagnes d'atlas
Persée - Notes de géographie physique algérienne

Mountain ranges of the Atlas Mountains
Mountain ranges of Algeria
Biosphere reserves of Algeria